"Round and Round" is a song written and recorded by American indie rock band Imagine Dragons for their major label debut EP Continued Silence. The song appears as the fourth track on the EP. Following inclusions on the setlists of many of the band's concerts and appearances as B-sides to their singles "It's Time" and "Hear Me", the song was also included on the worldwide release of their debut studio album, Night Visions as a deluxe edition track.

Release
"Round and Round" first appeared on the band's EP Continued Silence, which released on February 14, 2012. The song was later released on December 14, 2012 as a digital promotional single in the United Kingdom and Ireland. Since Continued Silence was not released in the region, "Round and Round" was offered as a free download on the iTunes Store and as a B-side to the "Hear Me" single. The song was eventually released worldwide on a deluxe edition of the band's debut album Night Visions, in February 2013.

The band performed the song live on Fuse's Hoppus on Music on March 15, 2012.

Track listing

Charts

Release history

References

2012 songs
Songs written by Wayne Sermon
Songs written by Dan Reynolds (musician)
Songs written by Daniel Platzman
Songs written by Ben McKee
2012 singles
Imagine Dragons songs
Song recordings produced by Alex da Kid
Interscope Records singles
Songs written by Alex da Kid